Professor Norman Bowery ,  (1944 – 25 October 2016) was a British pharmacologist and former Head of Division of Neuroscience and Chair of Pharmacology at the University of Birmingham from 1995 to 2004. He was president of the British Pharmacological Society from 1995 to 1997 and from 1999 to 2000.

His research work focused on GABAB receptors, including coining the term GABA B, and extensive studies of GABAB receptor pharmacology. He had previously worked at St Thomas' Hospital, London.

He was editor in chief of the journal Current Opinion in Pharmacology.

References

British pharmacologists
Academics of the University of Birmingham
2016 deaths